The following outline is provided as an overview of and topical guide to Manitoba:

Manitoba – Canadian prairie province. Agriculture, mostly concentrated in the fertile southern and western parts of the province, is vital to the province's economy; other major industries are transportation, manufacturing, mining, forestry, energy, and tourism. Manitoba's capital and largest city is Winnipeg.

General reference 
 Pronunciation: 
 Common English name(s): Manitoba
 Official English name(s): Manitoba
 Abbreviations and name codes
 Postal symbol: "R"
 ISO 3166-2 code:  CA-MB
 Internet second-level domain:  .mb.ca
 Adjectival(s): Manitoba/Manitoban/Manitobain
 Demonym(s): Manitoban/Manitobain

Geography of Manitoba 

Geography of Manitoba

 Manitoba is: a province of Canada.
 Population of Manitoba: 1,232,654 (est.)
 Area of Manitoba: 649,950 km2 (250,950 sq. miles)

Location 
 Manitoba is situated within the following regions:
 Northern Hemisphere, Western Hemisphere
 Americas
 North America
 Northern America
 Laurentia
 Canada
 Western Canada
 Canadian Prairies
 Time zones (see also Time in Canada):
 Central Standard Time (UTC-06), Central Daylight Time (UTC-05)
 Extreme points of Manitoba

Environment of Manitoba 

 Climate of Manitoba
 Geology of Manitoba
 Lake Winnipeg algae threat
 List of protected areas of Manitoba
 Wildlife of Manitoba

Natural geographic features of Manitoba 
 Islands of Manitoba
 Lakes of Manitoba
 List of dams and reservoirs in Manitoba
 Rivers of Manitoba
 Mountains of Manitoba

Heritage sites in Manitoba 
 Historic places in Manitoba
 National Historic Sites of Canada in Manitoba

Regions of Manitoba 

Regions of Manitoba

Manitoba reserves in Manitoba 

 List of native reserves in Manitoba

Municipalities of Manitoba 

Manitoba municipalities
 List of cities in Manitoba
 Capital of Manitoba: Winnipeg
 Geography of Winnipeg
 Climate of Winnipeg
 Demographics of Winnipeg
 History of Winnipeg
 List of mayors of Winnipeg
 List of rural municipalities in Manitoba

Demography of Manitoba 

Demographics of Manitoba

Government and politics of Manitoba 

Politics of Manitoba
 Capital of Manitoba: Winnipeg
 Elections in Manitoba (last 5)
 2016
 2011
 2007
 2003
 1999
 Political parties in Manitoba

Branches of the government of Manitoba 

Government of Manitoba

Executive branch of the government of Manitoba 
 Head of state: King of Canada, King Charles III
 Head of state's representative (Viceroy): Lieutenant Governor of Manitoba, Janice Filmon
 Previous lieutenant governors
 Head of government: Premier of Manitoba, Heather Stefanson
 Previous premiers
 Cabinet: Executive Council of Manitoba
 Minister of Innovation, Energy and Mines
 Minister of Infrastructure
 Minister of Conservation and Climate
 Minister of Indigenous Reconciliation and Northern Relations
 Minister responsible for sport
 Minister of Local Government
 Minister responsible for Emergency Measures
 Minister responsible for the Manitoba Lotteries Corporation Act
 Minister responsible for the Civil Service
 Minister of Finance
 Minister responsible for Crown corporations review and accountability
 Minister of Education
 Minister of Healthy Living, Seniors and Consumer Affairs
 Minister charged with the administration of the Liquor Control Act
 Minister of Entrepreneurship, Training and Trade
 Minister of Immigration and Multiculturalism
 Minister of Health
 Minister of Housing and Community Development
 Attorney-General of Manitoba
 Minister of Justice
 Minister responsible for Constitutional Affairs
 Minister of Family Services and Labour
 Minister responsible for Persons with Disabilities
 Minister responsible for the Status of Women
 Minister of Culture, Heritage and Tourism
 Minister of Advanced Education and Literacy
 Minister of Agriculture

Legislative branch of the government of Manitoba 

 Parliament of Manitoba (unicameral): Legislative Assembly of Manitoba
 Speaker of the Legislative Assembly of Manitoba:
 Manitoba Legislative Building
 Federal representation
 List of Manitoba senators

Judicial branch of the government of Manitoba 

 Federal Courts of Canada
 Supreme Court of Canada
 Federal Court of Appeal
 Tax Court of Canada
 Canadian court of appeal: Manitoba Court of Appeal
 Superior court: Court of King's Bench of Manitoba
 Provincial Court: Provincial Court of Manitoba
 Military court: Court Martial Appeal Court of Canada

Law and order in Manitoba 

Law of Manitoba
 Manitoba Bar Association –  the provincial  law society
 Capital punishment: none.
 Canada eliminated the death penalty for murder on July 14, 1976.
 Manitoba Act
 Law, government, and crime in Winnipeg
 Reference re Manitoba Language Rights

Military of Manitoba 

Canadian Forces
Being a part of Canada, Manitoba does not have its own military.  The Canadian Forces have members stationed in Manitoba.

Local government in Manitoba

History of Manitoba

History of Manitoba, by period 
 Rupert's Land / Red River Colony
 Red River Rebellion
 Manitoba Schools Question
 Winnipeg General Strike
 1950 Red River Flood
 Meech Lake Accord
 1997 Red River flood

History of Manitoba, by region 

 History of Winnipeg
 Timeline of Winnipeg history

Culture of Manitoba 

Culture of Manitoba
 Provincial decorations and medals
 Festivals in Manitoba
 Festival du Voyageur
 Folklorama
 Cinema of Manitoba

 Mass media in Manitoba
 Museums in Manitoba
 Manitoba music
 Manipogo
 Manitoba Day

People of Manitoba 

 Franco-Manitoban
 List of Manitobans
 Ethnic groups in Manitoba

Religion in Manitoba 

Religion in Manitoba
 Buddhism in Manitoba
 Christianity in Manitoba
 Hinduism in Manitoba
 Islam in Manitoba
 Judaism in Manitoba
 Sikhism in Manitoba
 Irreligion in Manitoba

Sports in Manitoba 

 Curl Manitoba
 List of curling clubs in Manitoba
 Baseball Manitoba
 Winnipeg Goldeyes (American Association)
 Winnipeg Blue Bombers (Canadian Football League)
 Winnipeg Jets (National Hockey League)
 Rugby Manitoba
 Major sporting events
 1999 Pan American Games

Symbols of Manitoba 

Symbols of Manitoba
 Coat of arms of Manitoba
 Flag of Manitoba
 Provincial flower: prairie crocus
 Provincial bird: great grey owl
 Provincial tree: white spruce
 Provincial motto: Gloriosus et Liber (Glorious and Free)
 Provincial symbol: bison
 Provincial capital: Winnipeg

Economy and infrastructure of Manitoba 

Economy of Manitoba
 Media in Manitoba
 List of television stations in Manitoba
 Radio stations in Manitoba
 Currency: Canadian dollar
 Economic history of Manitoba
 Manitoba Hydro
 Manitoba Health
 Regional Health Authorities of Manitoba
 List of hospitals in Manitoba
 Transportation in Manitoba
 Airports in Manitoba
 Railway stations in Manitoba
 Roads in Manitoba
 Vehicle registration plates of Manitoba
 Manitoba Public Insurance

Education in Manitoba 

Education in Manitoba
 Primary and secondary education in Manitoba
 School districts in Manitoba
 Higher education in Manitoba
 University of Manitoba
 University of Winnipeg
 Brandon University
 Red River College
 University College of the North
 Canadian Mennonite University

See also 

 Outline of Canada
 Outline of geography
 Outline of Canada
 Outline of Alberta
 Outline of British Columbia
 Outline of Nova Scotia
 Outline of Ontario
 Outline of Prince Edward Island
 Outline of Quebec
 Outline of Saskatchewan

References

External links 

 

Manitoba
Manitoba